Somerset Mall is a  shopping mall situated alongside the N2 freeway near the towns of Somerset West and Strand, in the Western Cape province of South Africa. The mall comprises 200 stores and 3,955 parking spaces.  Its anchors include Woolworths, Pick n Pay, Game, and Edgars

References

Shopping centres in Somerset West